Dark Castle is a 1986 platform game  for Macintosh published by Silicon Beach Software, later published by Three-Sixty Pacific for other platforms. It was designed and illustrated by Mark Pierce and programmed by Jonathan Gay. In Dark Castle, a young hero named Duncan tries to make his way to the evil Black Knight, dodging objects as well as solving occasional puzzles. 

A sequel, Beyond Dark Castle, was released in 1987. A second sequel, Return to Dark Castle, was announced in 2000, but it was not released until March 14, 2008.

Plot
When the evil Black Knight terrorizes the townspeople, Prince Duncan decides to topple his throne, but in order to do that, he must travel to the four sections of the castle: Fireball, Shield, Trouble and Black Knight.

After collecting the Fireball and Shield, Duncan makes his way to the Black Knight's throne room, where he topples the Black Knight's throne, and the Black Knight stands up shaking his fist, as a gargoyle takes Duncan to Trouble 3.

Gameplay

The game opens with a vista of the castle with storm clouds in the distance. The opening notes of Bach's Toccata and Fugue in D minor play and are followed by thunderclaps. The title along with the programming and development credits are shown on this screen.

Movement within Dark Castle is typical for most platformers. Duncan can run, jump and duck, and can throw a limited supply of rocks at his enemies. More rocks can be found in little bags along the way, as well as bottles of an elixir that provide a one-time antidote to bites of the numerous rats and bats found around the castle.

To defeat the Black Knight, Duncan needs to pull several levers which topple him from his throne. To aid Duncan, a magic shield and the power to hurl fireballs can, fortunately, be found within the Dark Castle. The game begins in the Great Hall, where the player can choose from four doors. The large center door leads to the Black Knight. One other is marked with the shield, and the remaining two mysteriously alternate between the fireball course and a more troubling path. The game can be played at three different skill levels, the hardest "Advanced" level containing more enemies and a few extra surprises.

Dark Castle may be the first game to use WASD keys and mouse for control. The trajectory and launching of rocks and fireballs are controlled via mouse movement and clicks respectively, while the character's locomotion is controlled via key strokes.

Duncan easily gets disoriented; when walking into a wall or falling a short distance without jumping he walks around in circles for a moment, mumbling incoherently. He is highly vulnerable to attacks during this time.

Falling into holes in the floor does not cause death but instead leads to a dungeon ("Trouble 3") which can be escaped with some effort. On easier difficulty levels, this causes a delay. However, this may be strategically necessary on the harder difficulty levels so that the player can stock up rocks and elixir.

Easter egg: Playing Dark Castle (and its sequel) with the computer's clock at December 25 or any Friday the 13th, the Great Hall or the throne room (respectively) will have holiday decorations.

Levels
This game has 14 levels, which came out of the 4 doors in the Great Hall, the first two doors are random.

 Leftmost door (usually): Trouble 1, Trouble 2, Trouble 3.
 Farther away door on left side (usually): Fireball 1, Fireball 2, Fireball 3, Fireball 4.
 Middle Door: Black Knight 1, Black Knight 2, Black Knight 3.
 Right Door: Shield 1, Shield 2, Shield 3, Shield 4.

Development
Mark Pierce was based in San Francisco with his own company MacroMind, while Jon Gay and the rest of the Silicon Beach team were in San Diego; so after an initial launch meeting, most of the collaboration between Pierce and Gay was handled remotely. Pierce designed the animations in MacroMind's "VideoWorks" (the direct ancestor of Adobe Director) and then mailed the files on floppies to Gay, who then coded the game in 68000 Assembly Language on an Apple Lisa (a few parts like the high-score system were written in Pascal). The digitized sound was created by Eric Zocher who worked with voice actor Dick Noel.

Ports and remakes

A version for the Mega Drive/Genesis was released by Electronic Arts in 1991.

An MS-DOS version of the original Dark Castle was also released, which was closer to the original game. Because of the lower resolution, color was used to make up for it; also, because the PC did not have a mouse at the time, aiming was done through the keyboard. There is some controversy over the colors, due to the nature of the coloring.

Versions for the Amiga, Atari ST and Commodore 64 were released in 1987 by Three-Sixty Pacific. Apple IIGS version came out in 1989. This port was programmed by Lane Roathe, and was almost identical to the Macintosh version except for having lower resolution, color graphics and some controls. John Romero converted the monochrome Macintosh art to 16-color super-res art.

A version for mobile was released in 2006. It is developed by Super Happy Fun Fun, which includes one of the two original developers, Mark Stephen Pierce; it was published by Bandai. It contains slightly remade level designs, borrowing from both Dark Castle and Beyond Dark Castle, it also has updated color graphics.

There was also a version released for CD-i. As of 2009, there was a port in the works for the iOS.

Color Dark Castle

In 1994, the game developer Delta Tao Software acquired the rights to some of Silicon Beach's old games, via Aldus, and were able to produce and publish the modernized Color Dark Castle.

The new version included full color graphics, while changing some other things such as the Water from fireball 2,3 into Lava. This version also included a new difficulty, which let the player skip to the end destination from any door in the great hall (e.g. Great Hall, to Fireball 4) with fewer enemies and easier gameplay. There is also a save feature whereby the game could be saved in the Great Hall, though only one game could be saved.

Reception
Computer Gaming World stated that Dark Castle was "the best arcade game I've seen for the Macintosh, and perhaps the best I've seen on any microcomputer, ever". The reviewer praised the sound and graphics, stating that he did not know that the Macintosh was capable of animations of such quality. He concluded that Dark Castle "is filled with lots of little touches that show it's one of the first steps toward what Silicon Beach likes to call 'interactive cartoons'." BYTE compared the game to Lode Runner, writing "There's nothing new about the basic concept, but the execution is impressive". The magazine praised its "slick animation and realistic digitized sound", and concluded that it "is a perfect way to fritter away those long winter evenings when you should be doing something productive". Compute! praised the Amiga version's "brilliant graphics, sound, and atmosphere" but criticized the keyboard/mouse control system and gameplay as too difficult. The reviewer also disliked the disk-based copy protection which caused him to fear damage to the disk drives, crashes when loading the game, and slow level loading.

Game reviewers Hartley and Pattie Lesser complimented the game in their "The Role of Computers" column in Dragon #122 (1987), calling it "the finest arcade/adventure game ever designed for the Macintosh computer — as a matter of fact, for any computer!" and stating, "The graphics and animation are quite literally stunning!". In a subsequent column, the reviewers gave the game 4 out of 5 stars. Macworld reviewed the Macintosh version of Dark Castle, praising its gameplay, graphics, and sound, stating that "Dark Castle is at its core a shoot-'em-up, duck-'n'-run type of game, but one so finely crafted it deserves a new classification that reflects its fast-paced action as well as its superb animation, graphics, and sound. The game has a humorous aspect as well.", and furthermore stating that "Dark Castle provides the highest quality graphics and sound of any Macintosh game available. Its action is fast and furious, its scripting sublime." Macworld summarises their review by listing the game's pros and cons, stating "Great graphics, sound, animation, and design" as positives, and stating "None" for Dark Castle's negatives.

In 1996, Computer Gaming World declared Dark Castle the 136th-best computer game ever released.

Legacy

Beyond Dark Castle

In 1987, the sequel Beyond Dark Castle was released, in which Duncan has to return and defeat the Black Knight, who is still alive. To access the Black Knight's tower, the player must first gather five magic orbs which are placed in various hard-to-reach places. The orbs must be returned to the Ante Chamber and placed on 5 pedestals for the gate to open so Duncan can face the Black Knight.

Beyond Dark Castle had an engine similar to Dark Castle but with improvements and additions like a health bar, bombs, and other items, as well as levels where the player could control a "personal helicopter". These levels and maze levels were side-scrollers instead of being limited to a single screen. Games could also be saved in a "computer room" level. Like all versions of Dark Castle, if the player beat the game on advanced, it presented a special ending.

Return to Dark Castle

In 2000, a new sequel called Return to Dark Castle was announced, being developed by Z Sculpt, where a new young hero called Bryant, the nephew of Duncan, must once again defeat the Black Knight. This game was not released until March 14, 2008.

Return to Dark Castle includes new gameplay mechanics, such as the player being able to keep weapons, and store extra orbs in a room. Though it had been stated that the game would include a level editor, with the ability to create custom quests, this feature is not included in the download. According to the game's official website at Super Happy Fun Fun, the "level editor will be released soon".

References

External links
 Running Dark Castle on an emulator, plus advanced walkthrough
 Dark Castle for cell phones from Super Happy Fun Fun
 Dark Castle links at Z Sculpt A collection of links, including the official forum

 
1986 video games
Amiga games
Apple IIGS games
Atari ST games
CD-i games
Commodore 64 games
DOS games
Classic Mac OS games
Mobile games
Platform games
Sega Genesis games
Video game franchises
Video games developed in the United States
Video games set in castles
IOS games
Single-player video games
Silicon Beach Software games